Lorik Agim Cana (born 27 July 1983) is an Albanian former professional footballer. He is currently the Grassroots ambassador for children's football in Albania, named by the Albanian Football Association on 26 October 2017.

Cana played in the top divisions of France, England, Italy and Turkey, representing Paris Saint-Germain, Sunderland, Galatasaray, Lazio, FC Nantes and Olympique de Marseille as well as the Albania national team for which he held the appearance record for Albania's most capped player of all time, with 93 caps since he made his debut in 2003 until his retirement in 2016. He used to play primarily as a defensive and central midfielder but later switched to centre-back. He participated in the first major international competition for Albania, the UEFA Euro 2016 held in France.

At the age of 16, Cana was invited to Arsenal for a trial, but failed to attend because he was denied a British visa. He began his senior club career playing for Paris Saint-Germain, before signing with rivals Olympique de Marseille in 2004 whom he went on to captain. In 2009, Cana made his league debut for Sunderland becoming the first player of Albanian origin to play in the Premier League. Later he joined Galatasaray, the most successful Turkish football club. Two years later, Cana signed for Italian Serie A club Lazio where he spent four years. In 2015, Cana returned to France, where he started his career, signing a two-year contract with Nantes.

Cana was eligible to play for either Albania, Switzerland or France, as he held all three passports. He chose Albania and made his international debut in June 2003, at the age of 19. Cana is Albania's most capped player of all time with 93 caps where he was named captain in 2011. After the end of the UEFA Euro 2016 Cana announced his retirement from football.

Early life
Lorik Cana was born in Pristina, Kosovo, from parents originally from Gjakova. He is the son of Agim Cana, a former football player of FC Prishtina. Cana watched every match of Pristina, since he was five years old and describes himself as an avid fan of the team. Cana's father's experience in football inspired him to take up the sport. In 1992 the entire family moved to Switzerland due to the Yugoslav Wars.

Club career

Early career
In 1997, Cana joined the local team Dardania Lausanne, an amateur football club founded by the Albanian community in Lausanne, coached by his father. He played at Dardania until 2000, when he was spotted and signed by French club Paris Saint-Germain.

Paris Saint-Germain
Cana had previously been invited to Arsenal in 2000 at the age of 16 for a trial, but failed to attend because he was denied a British visa. Following that, it was Paris Saint-Germain which benefited by the situation and invited him for a week trial. The Paris Saint-Germain Reserves coach Antoine Kombouaré was seduced by Cana's talent and Cana eventually signed a contract with Paris Saint-Germain. At Paris Saint-Germain, he spent three years working through the ranks of the French club. In his first season with PSG Reserves Cana made only 4 appearances. In the next season 2001–02 he suffered a knee injury and made only 12 appearances where also scored his first goal. Cana established himself as a regular part of the reserves team in his third season 2002–03 making 21 appearances and scoring a goal. In 2003 Cana was invited by the first team coach Luis Fernández invited him at training session and at the end of the season, with PSG having nothing to play for in the league, the Parisian coach took the opportunity to rotate his squad. On 19 April Cana made his senior team debut against Nantes playing the full 90-minutes match and provided an assist for the only goal of his side which served to take a 1–1 draw. In his senior debut for PSG, he was awarded the Man of the Match. He went on to play in other 2 matches, 1 as a starter until half-time and 1 as the full 90-minutes.

During the 2003–04 season, he established himself as a starter under coach Vahid Halilhodžić and was associated with another young defensive midfielder, Modeste M'bami. Despite their lack of experience, they played a big part in the club's good season, where Cana himself played in 32 games and scored one goal as the team won the Coupe de France and finished second in the Ligue 1, proving to be one of the most successful seasons of his career. This was repeated the next season, when he also played 32 games for the Paris team and scored one goal.

Olympique de Marseille

At the beginning of the 2005–06 season, however, there was a change of coach at Paris Saint-Germain and Cana fell out of favour. This prompted him to move to the south of France to join Marseille. After joining OM, he cemented his place in the starting XI and scored the winning goal in the first match between Marseille and his former club, PSG; Cana scored in the 78th minute via a header following a free-kick. Cana concluded his first season at Marseille with 43 matches in all competitions, 28 full 90-minutes in league matches, 6 in cup, 1 in league cup and 8 in UEFA Cup 2005-06. Marseille recorded 60 league points, an improvement on previous seasons and finished 5th in rank granting a place in the 2006 UEFA Intertoto Cup. Marseille reached the 2006 Coupe de France Final losing 1–2 against Cana's former side PSG.

He retained his starting place in the 2006–07 season under coach Albert Emon. He played 33 full 90-minutes league matches helping Marseille to finish as runners-up with 64 points, behind Lyon. He was granted as a captain in the whole 2006–07 Coupe de France leading his team until the final where Marseille lost it on 12 May 2007 against Sochaux-Montbéliard 4–5 after Penalty shoot-out where Cana himself scored the 3rd penalty take.

2007–08 season 
Cana became the team's captain after the departure of Habib Beye to Newcastle United during the summer of 2007. In his first season in his career as a captain Cana led his team in 34 out 38 overall league matches all as full 90-minutes towards 3rd place in Ligue 1 which secured them the qualification to UEFA Champions League for next season. Cana played in all 6 2007–08 UEFA Champions League group stage matches. Marseille became the first French team to win at Anfield when they beat 2007 runners-up Liverpool 1–0, and the team took six out of six points from their opening two games. They only drew one more match, and in a winner-takes-all final group game they lost 4–0 to Liverpool, coming third in the Champions League Group A table, thus qualifying for the 2007–08 UEFA Cup final phase, in which Marseille passed the third round with Cana playing the full 90-minutes in both legs against Spartak Moscow. He also received a yellow card in each match, thus missing in the last 16 first-leg match against Zenit Saint Petersburg. The match was won 3–1 by Marseille. He played full in the second leg in which Marseille lost 2–0, eliminating Marseille on away goals. In the second half of the season Cana was switched to play as centre-back.

2008–09 season 
Similar to his previous 2 years at Marseille, Cana began the new season under new management as the club was now being led by the Belgian Eric Gerets. He was again team's captain and appeared in 48 total matches scoring a career-high 3 goals and also assisting in 3 goals. Cana formed partnerships in the midfield with wingers Mathieu Valbuena, Samir Nasri and midfielder Benoît Cheyrou as Marseille boasted the third-best attack in the league behind champions Lyon and Bordeaux, who finished first and second in the league, respectively.

Cana left the club for English Premier League side Sunderland in August 2009. However, during his four years in Southern France, he failed to win a single trophy. He was described as a very aggressive defender during that time and nowadays he mentions that Marseille was his favourite team of all time and he would go back if they gave him an offer.

Sunderland
Cana joined Sunderland on a four-year contract for a fee of around £5 million on 24 July 2009. He was soon handed the team's captaincy by manager Steve Bruce, although Bruce later stated a captain had yet to be appointed. On 15 August, Cana made his league debut for Sunderland and contributed with an impressive performance in a 1–0 win over Bolton Wanderers, becoming the first Albanian player to play in the Premier League. He was appointed as Sunderland's captain for the 2009–10 season on 3 September. He led his team in 35 games in all competitions. Sunderland finished 13th in the league and progressed until last 16 in EFL Cup and until 4th round in FA Cup.

Galatasaray
Cana joined Galatasaray on 8 July 2010 for a €4.5 million transfer fee. He signed a four-year contract worth €2 million per season, plus bonuses based on appearances. His stay at the club was hampered by a back injury during mid-season. Because they were going through a crisis throughout the whole season, Cana failed to make too much impact, though he was still a favourite of the supporters because of his resilience on the pitch.

Lazio
On 3 July 2011, Cana completed a transfer to Italian Serie A club Lazio as part of Fernando Muslera's transfer to Galatasaray. The transfer was completed for €800,000 with the player signing until June 2016 with a wage of €1.7 million per season. He was given squad number 27 and made his competitive debut later on 21 September by entering in the last minutes of the 1–2 win at Cesena. His first score-sheet contributions came on his 7th Lazio appearance later on 10 December versus Lecce, netting the second of the match only one minute after coming on in an eventual 2–3 away win. Cana's first months at capital club were marred by constant niggling injuries and on 31 January 2012, Lazio confirmed that Cana would miss six weeks due to a back injury sustained in training.

Cana hit form following the return, winning a place in the starting lineup, also thanks to Lazio's players being haunted with injuries and suspensions. He netted the second of campaign on 6 May 2012, a 25-yard goal versus Atalanta, to keep Lazio's UEFA Champions League hopes alive. He concluded his first season in Rome by making 15 league appearances as Lazio finished 4th in the championship

Cana begun utilised as centre-back under manager Vladimir Petković in the 2012–13 season. The move was praised by Italian media. On 23 February 2013, Cana made a great performance in the 2012–13 Europa League round of 16 2–0 win over Borussia Mönchengladbach which earned him a place at UEFA's best XI of the week. Cana spent the 2012–13 season between bench and playing field, collecting 38 appearances in all competitions, including 24 in league. He also made 5 cup appearances, including the final as Lazio beat city rivals Roma to win the trophy for the 6th time. This win constituted his first trophy win at Lazio.

Cana was a regular starter during the first part of 2013–14 campaign. He netted his first goal of the season on 24 November 2013, a last-minute equalizer to save a 1–1 draw at Sampdoria. It was his first goal after 18 months. However, Cana struggled to play in the second part under new manager Edy Reja, as the Italian did not see him as a lineup player. Cana scored his second of the campaign later on 2 March 2014, an early goal via a bicycle kick, as Lazio won 1–0 at Fiorentina. Cana finished his second Lazio season by playing 32 matches in all competitions. With 344 balls recovered in 16 matches, Cana was ranked fourth-best defender in Serie A.

Cana struggled for minutes in the 2014–15 season due to rivality with newly signed defenders Stefan de Vrij and Santiago Gentiletti. Cana however played full-90 minutes in the opening match of 2014–15 Serie A versus Milan, a 1–3 loss at San Siro. He made his 100th Lazio appearance on 7 December by entering as a substitute in the 1–2 win over Parma. He spent the majority of his 4th season in Italy on bench, recording only 20 appearances between league and cup. He left the club afterwards.

Nantes
After four years in Italy with Lazio, on 31 August 2015, Cana returned to the French Ligue 1, signing a two-year contract with Nantes. On 21 November 2015, he played his 200th Ligue 1 match during the 1–0 away loss against Monaco.

He left the club in the summer 2016.

International career

2003–09: First years
Cana was eligible to play for either Albania, Switzerland or France, as he held all three passports. His choice was Albania and joined the team in early 2003 after receiving the Albanian cititzenship and subsequently an invitation by then coach Hans-Peter Briegel. Cana's international debut occurred on 11 June 2003 at the age of 19, appearing as a substitute in the Euro 2004 qualifying match versus Switzerland, finished in a 3–2 away loss. He went on to play 2 other matches in the qualifying campaign, both versus Georgia in September, as Albania lost away 3–0 and took a win home 3–1, finishing 4th above Georgia in Group 10 with 8 points.

Cana was switched to centre-back in the 2006 FIFA World Cup qualification due to absence Geri Çipi. He was a regular starter under Hans-Peter Briegel and performed well, missing only matchday 8 against Georgia due to the yellow card suspension, despite Albania finishing 5th in Group 2. Cana scored his first international goal on his 16th appearance, netting the second of the 2–1 win over Azerbaijan at Qemal Stafa Stadium.

Cana was given a new role under new manager Otto Barić, who switched him as a defensive midfielder along with Altin Lala. During the UEFA Euro 2008 qualifying, Cana received his first red card in Albania colours on 12 September 2007 in the match against Netherlands after an altercation with Wesley Sneijder and Ruud van Nistelrooy; with ten men Albania conceded a 91st-minute goal to lose the game 0–1. As a result of misconduct Cana was suspended for two next matches. Cana returned to the field on 17 November in the match against Belarus where he provided an assist for Erjon Bogdani's temporary equaliser. Albania eventually slumped in a 2–4 home defeat. Albania concluded the campaign ranking in the 5th place out 7 teams of Group G with 11 points equalled to Slovenia but was ranked ahead due to better goal difference. Cana himself appeared in 8 matches.

2008–11: 50th appearance, assuming the captaincy
Cana continued to be a regular starter in the 2010 FIFA World Cup qualification, collecting 720 minutes from 8 matches as Albania finished Group 1 in 5th place, leaving behind only Malta. He started the qualifying campaign by playing as a defensive midfielder and subsequently played as a centre-back, often along Debatik Curri.

Cana captained Albania for the first time in a friendly game against Montenegro on 25 May 2010. His first competitive match as captain was on 8 October 2010 against Bosnia and Herzegovina in the matchday 3 of UEFA Euro 2012 qualifying. The match ended in a 1–1 draw at Qemal Stafa Stadium which put Albania temporarily on top. Cana reached half-century appearances for Albania later on 7 June 2011 against the same opponent as the ten-man Albania was defeated 0–2. After the end of the Euro 2012 qualification campaign in October 2011, Altin Lala and Ervin Skela retired from international football, thus making Cana the regular captain of Albania.

2012–13: Rising with De Biasi
Albania become a more dangerous opponent during the 2014 FIFA World Cup qualification under management of Gianni De Biasi. With Cana as captain, Albania was at one point second on the group with 4 matches remaining but the team didn't maintain the form and eventually finished 5th with 11 points. Albania reached some impressive results however, like winning 1–0 at home versus Slovenia, the first ever win against them, and achieving a historic 1–0 win against Norway.

Cana was included in the best XI of the players that missed out at the 2014 FIFA World Cup final stages because of failing to qualify with their national team.

2014–16: Record breaking caps and UEFA Euro 2016 glory
Cana started the UEFA Euro 2016 qualifying campaign by playing the full 90 minutes in an historical 1–0 away victory against Portugal. It was also the first ever win against Portugal. Later on 14 October during the delicate match versus Serbia, Cana wrestled a Serbian fan to the ground. The fan, who had previously hit Bekim Balaj with a chair, bit Cana's finger and tried to cut it with his teeth. Cana reported that he got injured by it. After the match, Cana, along with Taulant Xhaka, were declared honorary citizens from the mayor of the city of Mitrovica, Kosovo, for the bravery shown in protecting national symbols. Cana received a similar award by the city of Bajram Curri in northern Albania.

In the last qualifying match versus Armenia, Albania had only one way to secure direct qualification and that was to win at the Vazgen Sargsyan Republican Stadium. Cana captained Albania as they achieved a historic 3–0 win which clinched them second place in Group I and a spot to the UEFA Euro 2016 which was Albania's first ever appearance at a major men's football tournament.

On 21 May 2016, Cana was named in Albania's preliminary 27-man squad for UEFA Euro 2016, and in Albania's final 23-man UEFA Euro 2016 squad on 31 May.

Cana captained Albania in their opening Group A match against Switzerland. He was booked early on for a foul on Blerim Džemaili before becoming the first player to be sent off in the tournament just before half-time, receiving his marching orders after handling the ball outside the box. He got returned to play as a substitute for Migjen Basha in the 83rd minute against Romania in an Albania's historical 1–0 win with a goal scored by Armando Sadiku. Albania finished the group in third place with three points and a goal difference of –2, ranking last of the third-placed teams.

Retirement
Cana announced his retirement from international football on 23 June 2016.

Cana is currently Albania's all-time most capped player with 92 appearances. He also holds the records for the most appearances by an Albanian international in the FIFA World Cup qualification along Ervin Skela with 28 in overall, for the most appearances at the UEFA European Championship final & qualifying phases counted together with 29 in overall and the most appearances as captain with 41, being such from 2011 until his participation in the first major international competition for Albania, the 2016 UEFA European Championship held in France. He has also the worst disciplinary record of any Albanian international, receiving 26 yellow cards and 2 red cards.

Post-football
On 26 October 2017 he was named by the Albanian Football Association as the grassroots ambassador for football in Albania.

Personal life
Lorik Cana is the son of retired footballer Agim Cana. His father's career brought the family to Kosovo, but because of war in the region, Lorik and his family were forced to flee to Lausanne, Switzerland. He is a UNO-ambassador against poverty. In an interview, Cana stated that archeology is one of his biggest interests and that he plans to work in the Albanology field after his footballing career after pursuing a university degree in History. He married Monica Ercoli, an Italian, on 8 June 2014 and the ceremony took place on 27 June 2014. They also have a son named Boiken. They currently reside in Tirana, Albania. On 15 January 2015 Cana was named Honorary Ambassador of Kosovo.

Career statistics

Club

International

Scores and results list Albania's goal tally first, score column indicates score after each Cana goal.

Honours
Paris Saint-Germain
Coupe de France: 2003–04; runner-up: 2002–03
Trophée des Champions runner-up: 2004

Marseille
Coupe de France runner-up: 2005–06, 2006–07

Lazio
Coppa Italia: 2012–13; runner-up: 2014–15
Supercoppa Italiana runner-up: 2013, 2015

Individual
Albanian Footballer of the Year: 2003
Albanian Fan's Footballer of the Year: 2009
Albanian Sports Ambassador: 2018

Notes

References

External links

 
 
 
 
 
 
 Lorik Cana at OM.net 
 Lorik Cana at Yahoo Sports
 
 Lorik Cana profile at FSHF.org
 Lorik Cana – Euro 2016 profile at FSHF.org
 

1983 births
Living people
Sportspeople from Pristina
Albanian footballers
Kosovo Albanians
Association football central defenders
Association football midfielders
Paris Saint-Germain F.C. players
Olympique de Marseille players
Sunderland A.F.C. players
Galatasaray S.K. footballers
S.S. Lazio players
FC Nantes players
Championnat National 2 players
Ligue 1 players
Premier League players
Süper Lig players
Serie A players
Albania international footballers
UEFA Euro 2016 players
Albanian emigrants to Switzerland
Albanian emigrants to France
Kosovan emigrants to Switzerland
Kosovan emigrants to France
Albanian expatriate footballers
Kosovan expatriate footballers
Albanian expatriate sportspeople in Turkey
Albanian expatriate sportspeople in Italy
Albanian expatriate sportspeople in England
Albanian expatriate sportspeople in Switzerland
Kosovan expatriate sportspeople in Switzerland
Expatriate footballers in England
Expatriate footballers in Turkey
Expatriate footballers in Italy